Pawned is a 1922 American silent melodrama film directed by Irvin Willat, and starring Tom Moore, Edith Roberts, Charles K. Gerrard, Josef Swickard, Mabel Van Buren, and James O. Barrows. It is based on the 1921 novel of the same name by Frank L. Packard. The film was released by Selznick Distributing Corporation on November 13, 1922.

Cast
Tom Moore as John Bruce
Edith Roberts as Claire Veniza
Charles K. Gerrard as Dr. Crang
Josef Swickard as Paul Veniza
Mabel Van Buren as Mrs. Veniza
James O. Barrows as Old Hawkins
Eric Mayne as Gilbert Larmond
William Elmer as Joe Burke

Preservation
The film is now considered lost.

Gallery

References

External links

1922 drama films
Silent American drama films
1922 films
American silent feature films
American black-and-white films
Films based on Canadian novels
Lost American films
Selznick Pictures films
Melodrama films
1922 lost films
Lost drama films
Films directed by Irvin Willat
1920s American films